Megachile timorensis is a species of bee in the family Megachilidae. It was described by Heinrich Friese in 1918.

References

Timorensis
Insects described in 1918